Jack Whitney (February 21, 1905 – November 2, 1992) was an American sound engineer. He won two Academy Awards, one for Best Sound Recording and the other for Best Visual Effects. He was nominated six more times in the category Best Sound.

Selected filmography
Won
 The Thief of Bagdad (1940 – Best Special Effects)
 That Hamilton Woman (1941 – Best Sound)

Nominated
 The Howards of Virginia (1940)
 Friendly Enemies (1942)
 Hangmen Also Die! (1943)
 It Happened Tomorrow (1944)
 The Southerner (1945)
 T-Men (1947)

References

External links

1905 births
1992 deaths
American audio engineers
Special effects people
Best Sound Mixing Academy Award winners
Best Visual Effects Academy Award winners
20th-century American engineers